West Athens is a census-designated place (CDP) in Los Angeles County, California. The population was 9,393 at the 2020 census. It is an unincorporated community within the 2nd Supervisorial District of Los Angeles County. West Athens is served by the Los Angeles County Sheriff's Department, operating out of the South Los Angeles Station. The approximate boundaries for West Athens are: 87th Street to the north, Vermont Avenue to the east, El Segundo Boulevard to the south, and approximately Western Avenue to Van Ness Avenue to the west. West Athens is predominantly residential, with commercial uses along its main corridors. Los Angeles Southwest Community College lies within the West Athens neighborhood and city limits.

Geography
West Athens is located at  (33.922414, -118.301156).

Demographics

2020 census

Note: the US Census treats Hispanic/Latino as an ethnic category. This table excludes Latinos from the racial categories and assigns them to a separate category. Hispanics/Latinos can be of any race.

Per the 2020 Census, the population was 9,393.

2010 Census
At the 2010 census West Athens had a population of 8,729. The racial makeup of West Athens was 1,584 (18.1%) White (1.3% Non-Hispanic White), 4,578 (52.4%) African American, 31 (0.4%) Native American, 111 (1.3%) Asian, 10 (0.1%) Pacific Islander, 2,127 (24.4%) from other races, and 288 (3.3%) from two or more races. Hispanic or Latino of any race were 3,843 persons (44.0%).

The census reported that 8,674 people (99.4% of the population) lived in households, 50 (0.6%) lived in non-institutionalized group quarters, and 5 (0.1%) were institutionalized.

There were 2,525 households, 1,261 (49.9%) had children under the age of 18 living in them, 1,028 (40.7%) were opposite-sex married couples living together, 774 (30.7%) had a female householder with no husband present, 227 (9.0%) had a male householder with no wife present.  There were 175 (6.9%) unmarried opposite-sex partnerships, and 10 (0.4%) same-sex married couples or partnerships. 378 households (15.0%) were one person and 138 (5.5%) had someone living alone who was 65 or older. The average household size was 3.44.  There were 2,029 families (80.4% of households); the average family size was 3.77.

The age distribution was 2,539 people (29.1%) under the age of 18, 1,025 people (11.7%) aged 18 to 24, 2,275 people (26.1%) aged 25 to 44, 1,994 people (22.8%) aged 45 to 64, and 896 people (10.3%) who were 65 or older.  The median age was 32.1 years. For every 100 females, there were 91.5 males.  For every 100 females age 18 and over, there were 86.7 males.

There were 2,691 housing units at an average density of 2,013.5 per square mile, of the occupied units 1,328 (52.6%) were owner-occupied and 1,197 (47.4%) were rented. The homeowner vacancy rate was 1.8%; the rental vacancy rate was 8.4%.  4,427 people (50.7% of the population) lived in owner-occupied housing units and 4,247 people (48.7%) lived in rental housing units.

According to the 2010 United States Census, West Athens had a median household income of $46,391, with 23.6% of the population living below the federal poverty line.

2000 Census

At the 2000 census there were 9,101 people, 2,573 households, and 2,102 families in the CDP. The population density was 6,784.4 inhabitants per square mile (2,622.3/km). The racial makeup of the CDP was 12.9% White, 65.1% African American, 0.6% Native American, 1.6% Asian, 0.4% Pacific Islander, 25.1% from other races, and 3.3% from two or more races. Hispanic or Latino people of any race were 25.3%.

Of the 2,573 households 45.7% had children under the age of 18 living with them, 45.4% were married couples living together, 28.4% had a female householder with no husband present, and 18.3% were non-families. 14.2% of households were one person and 4.5% were one person aged 65 or older.  The average household size was 3.54 and the average family size was 3.83.

The age distribution was 35.1% under the age of 18, 10.3% from 18 to 24, 28.3% from 25 to 44, 19.0% from 45 to 64, and 7.3% 65 or older.  The median age was 28 years. For every 100 females, there were 89.6 males.  For every 100 females age 18 and over, there were 86.7 males.

The median household income was $35,423 and the median family income  was $39,028. Males had a median income of $27,484 versus $31,750 for females. The per capita income for the CDP was $12,903.  About 24.0% of families and 25.8% of the population were below the poverty line, including 35.9% of those under age 18 and 18.6% of those age 65 or over.

Education
West Athens is served by the Los Angeles Unified School District such as:

Schools

 West Athens Elementary School
 Clay Middle School
 Washington Preparatory High School

Colleges

 Los Angeles Southwest College

Infrastructure

Emergency services
The Los Angeles County Sheriff's Department (LASD) operates the South Los Angeles Station serving West Athens. It also operates the Audrey & Sydney Irmas Youth Activity Center in West Athens.

Government

Newspapers
 Morningside Park Chronicle is an unincorporated community newspaper based in Morningside Park that also covers the West Athens area.

See also

Athens, California

References

Census-designated places in Los Angeles County, California
Unincorporated communities in California
Census-designated places in California
Unincorporated communities in Los Angeles County, California